Eli Hoover House and Confectionery is a historic home and confectionery located at Muncie, Delaware County, Indiana. The house was built in 1899, and is a -story, Queen Anne style red brick dwelling with limestone detailing.  It has a multiple gable roof, corner entrance, and slate fishscale shingles on the gable ends.  It was originally built for residential and commercial purposes.

It was added to the National Register of Historic Places in 1988.

References

Houses on the National Register of Historic Places in Indiana
Queen Anne architecture in Indiana
Houses completed in 1899
Houses in Muncie, Indiana
National Register of Historic Places in Muncie, Indiana